Moritz Römling (born 30 April 2001) is a German professional footballer who plays as a left-back for  club Rot-Weiss Essen, on loan from VfL Bochum.

Career
Römling made his professional debut for VfL Bochum in the 2. Bundesliga on 23 February 2019, starting in the home match against Holstein Kiel before being substituted out in the 61st minute for Simon Zoller, with the match finishing as a 3–1 loss. On 6 January 2021, Römling and his Bochum teammate Lars Holtkamp joined Wuppertaler SV on loan for the remainder of the 2020–21 season. On 15 June 2021, Bochum announced Römling being loaned to Türkgücü Munich for the 2021–22 3. Liga season. For the 2022–23 season, Römling joined Rot-Weiss Essen on loan.

Career statistics

References

External links
 
 Profile at kicker.de

2001 births
Living people
People from Witten
Sportspeople from Arnsberg (region)
Footballers from North Rhine-Westphalia
German footballers
Germany youth international footballers
Association football fullbacks
VfL Bochum players
Wuppertaler SV players
Türkgücü München players
Rot-Weiss Essen players
2. Bundesliga players
3. Liga players
Regionalliga players